Black frog may refer to:

 Black microhylid frog (Melanobatrachus indicus) a frog in the family Microhylidae endemic to the Western Ghats, India
 Black rain frog (Breviceps fuscus), a frog in the family Brevicipitidae endemic to South Africa
 Black torrent frog (Micrixalus saxicola), a frog in the family Micrixalidae endemic to the Western Ghats, India
 Roraima black frog (Oreophrynella quelchii), a frog in the family Bufonidae found in Venezuela, Guyana, and Brazil

Animal common name disambiguation pages